Ngulu may refer to:
 Ngulu language, a language of Tanzania
 Ngulu people
 Ngulu Atoll, an island in the Federated States of Micronesia
 Ngulu (weapon), an execution sword of the Ngombe people